Tillandsia rotundata is a species of flowering plant in the family Bromeliaceae, native to Guatemala, Honduras and southeastern Mexico (Chiapas). It was first described by Lyman Bradford Smith in 1945 as the variety rotundata of Tillandsia fasciculata and raised to a full species by  Cecelia Sue Gardner in 1984.

References

rotundata
Flora of Chiapas
Flora of Guatemala
Flora of Honduras
Epiphytes
Plants described in 1945